The barred becard (Pachyramphus versicolor) is a small passerine bird which is a resident breeding species in highlands from Costa Rica to northwestern  Ecuador and northern Bolivia. It has traditionally been placed in Cotingidae or Tyrannidae, but evidence strongly suggests it belongs in Tityridae, where it is now placed by the South American Classification Committee.

The adult barred becard is 12 cm long and weighs 14 g; it has a conspicuous eye-ring.  The adult male has black upperparts with much white in the wings. The sides of the head and throat have yellowish-green shading to white on the rest of the underparts. The underparts are finely barred with black. The adult female has a grey crown and nape, olive-green upperparts and largely rufous wings. The greenish-yellow underparts are finely barred and dusky. Young males are much duller and greener than the adults, with weaker barring. The calls include a soft but persistent weet weet weet weet or a teseep tesep tseep tseep.

The barred becard is found in the canopy and middle levels of mountain forests, coming lower at edges and in adjacent more open woodland. It is mainly found at altitudes between 1500–2500 m, sometimes higher early in the year. Barred becards actively pick large insects and spiders off the foliage in flight. They also regularly hover to take small berries. They can occur singly, in pairs or family groups, or often as part of a mixed-species feeding flock.

The nest, built by the female in a high fork of a tree branch 15–23 m up, is a 30 cm diameter spherical structure of plant material with a low entrance. The typical clutch is two dark brown-blotched brownish white eggs, laid between April and June and incubated by the female alone for 18–20 days to hatching. The male helps to feed the young.

References

Further reading

 

barred becard
Birds of Costa Rica
Birds of the Northern Andes
barred becard